The New York Library Association (NYLA) is a group that promotes libraries in New York. It was founded in 1890 and was the first statewide organization of librarians in the United States.  One of its founders was Melvil Dewey, who has had a lasting impact on libraries in the United States.  The association was granted a provisional charter in 1929 and its Absolute Charter in 1946.

Affiliation

NYLA is now affiliated with the American Library Association (ALA) as the New York Chapter of that national body.

Current status
According to the NYLA:
Members of the State Association include librarians of public, system, school, college and university and many special libraries, library trustees, and friends of libraries. From a membership of 43 in 1890, the Association has grown to a vital organization of several thousand members, representing not only the libraries of New York State but also including many members, State and institutional, from all over the United States.

The association publishes a weekly email newsletter, 'News You Can Use' and a monthly electronic publication, 'NYLA Bulletin'. NYLA is active in advocating for relevant issues such as improving library funding and improving accessibility of publicly funded research.

NYLA also recognizes members' achievements and contributions to the library community through awards, fellowships, and scholarships for library school students.

References

External links
New York Library Association
Finding Aid to New York Library Association Records, 1890-1988 at the New York State Library, accessed May 18, 2016.

Library associations in the United States
Library Association
1890 establishments in New York (state)
Library-related professional associations